Lubrze  is a village in the administrative district of Gmina Krzykosy, within Środa Wielkopolska County, Greater Poland Voivodeship, in west-central Poland.
This village was the site of the battle of Lubrze in 1656, during the Second Northern War or the Deluge.
The village has a population of 90.

References

Lubrze

Photos of Lubrze